Falk Boden (born 20 January 1960) is a retired German cyclist. He had his best achievements in the 100 km team time trial, in which he won a silver medal for East Germany at the 1980 Summer Olympics, as well as three gold and one silver medals at the world championships in 1979, 1981, 1989 and 1990. He missed the 1984 Summer Olympics due to their boycott by East Germany and competed in the Friendship Games instead, winning a gold medal. He won the German National Road Race in 1991.

Individually, he won the following races:
 Peace Race, 1983
 DDR-Rundfahrt, 1980 and 1984
 Niederoesterreich Rundfahrt, 1984
Regio Tour International, 1989
Goppingen, 1993 
Coca-Cola Trophy, 1993

References

1960 births
Living people
People from Elsterwerda
People from Bezirk Cottbus
East German male cyclists
German male cyclists
Cyclists from Brandenburg
Olympic cyclists of East Germany
Cyclists at the 1980 Summer Olympics
Olympic medalists in cycling
Olympic silver medalists for East Germany
German cycling road race champions
UCI Road World Champions (elite men)
Medalists at the 1980 Summer Olympics
Recipients of the Patriotic Order of Merit in gold
20th-century German people